Counter-terrorism analysts prepared a Summary of Evidence memo for the Administrative Review Board hearings of approximately 460 captives in the Guantanamo Bay detention camps, in Cuba from December 2004 to December 2005.

Release of the memos
The Department of Defense partially complied with a Freedom of Information Act request to release names and transcripts from the captives' Combatant Status Review Tribunals and Administrative Review Board hearings, on March 3, 2006.  The Department of Defense released 59 portable document format files, containing  transcripts, memos, and other documents.  Three of the PDF files contained 121 Summary of Evidence memos.

In early September 2007 The DoD released fourteen pdf files that contained all 464 Summary of Evidence memos prepared for the first annual Board hearings, and ten files that contained all 333 Summary of Evidence memos prepared for the second annual Board hearings.

Discrepancies in the spelling of the captives' names
The names of the captives were redacted from all the transcripts.  Their transcripts were identified only by their ID numbers.
The captives' Summary of Evidence memos, on the other hand, had their ID numbers redacted, but the captives' names were in the clear.

On April 20, 2006 the Department of Defense released a list of the names, nationalities, and ID numbers of the 558 captive whose status double-checked by a Combatant Status Review Tribunal.
The release of a list of names, and ID numbers allowed the transcripts to be correlated with the captives' names.  It also allowed the official spelling of the names, as of April 20, 2006, to be compared with official spelling of the names in 2005.

Approximately half of the names were spelled consistently on the Summary of Evidence memos and official list of names released on April 20, 2006.

The Department of Defense released a second official list on May 15, 2006.
The Department of Defense said the 759 names on the second list represented all the captives who were held, in military custody, in Guantanamo.
However the names of several dozen men who have been reported to have been held captive in Guantanamo were missing from the official lists.

See also
Administrative Review Board transcript
Combatant Status Review Tribunal transcripts
Guantanamo military commission
OARDEC
Summary of Evidence (CSRT)

References

Guantanamo Bay captives legal and administrative procedures